The Teeth was an indie rock band from Philadelphia consisting of twin brothers Aaron MoDavis on rhythm guitar and Peter MoDavis on bass guitar. Other members include Brian Ashby on lead guitar and Jonas Oesterle on drums. They were created in 2001 when the MoDavis brothers moved to Philadelphia, and they have since risen to prominence in the Philadelphia area and have reached a cult status throughout the rest of the United States.

Aaron, Peter, and Brian first played together while they were students at Freedom High School in Bethlehem, PA. Initially, Brian, Peter, and their drummer friend Greg Kulik briefly were part of a band called "The Salty Dogs." Later, these same three, along with Brian's brother Doug Ashby, formed the blues band Hurry Down Sunshine, which cut two CDs, the best of which, "Raw in Memphis" (recorded at Sun Studios and still available from Amazon), didn't feature Peter or Greg but did include some guitar solos by Brian Ashby.

Often appearing at Open-Mike Nights sponsored by Freedom High's literary-and-arts magazine PEN AND INK, Brian, Peter, and Aaron performed together in various combinations, sometimes covering Bowie tunes and sometimes (as "The Pants") featuring original songs often heavily influenced by Brian Wilson, Talking Heads, Bowie, and the Beatles. (In these early days, Mark Cunningham, their eighth-grade English teacher at East Hills Middle School, helped initiate their love of the above masters.)

In 2005, the band performed at North East Sticks Together.

As of March 2008, The Teeth disbanded after their last tour with The Dead Trees, just after their performance at the South by Southwest Music Festival in Austin, Texas.  They have since formed another band called The Purples.

Critical reception
A number of sources have praised the Teeth, including Rolling Stone, Paste magazine, RJD2 in XLR8R magazine, and Jon Pareles in The New York Times.

In media
In 2005, Moonrock Films created a documentary called Bones Grow: An Introduction to the Teeth that contains a series of live performances and practice sessions of the band.

Discography
 Send My Regards to the Sunshine (2002), Park the Van
 Carry the Wood - EP (2005), Park the Van
 You're My Lover Now (2007), Park the Van

References

External links
 Official website
 Teeth's Myspace
 Park the Van's Teeth page
 Interview With The MoDavis brothers

Musical groups from Philadelphia
Musical groups established in 2001
Musical groups disestablished in 2008